The Ravan Baku FK 2015-16 season was Ravan's first season back in the Azerbaijan Premier League, following their relegation at the end of the 2013–14 season, and seventh in their history. It was their first season with Emin Quliyev as manager, during which they participated in the Azerbaijan Cup as well as the League.

Season Events
On 17 October, Emin Quliyev resigned as manager and was replaced with Bahman Hasanov.

Squad

Transfers

Summer

In:

Out:

Winter

In:

Out:

Competitions

Azerbaijan Premier League

Results summary

Results

League table

Azerbaijan Cup

Squad statistics

Appearances and goals

|-
|colspan="14"|Players who appeared for Ravan Baku but left during the season:

|}

Goal scorers

Disciplinary record

Notes
Qarabağ have played their home games at the Tofiq Bahramov Stadium since 1993 due to the ongoing situation in Quzanlı.

References

Azerbaijani football clubs 2015–16 season
Ravan Baku FC seasons